Mariotta or Mariota may refer to:

Mariota, Countess of Ross (died 1440), Scottish noblewoman
Marcus Mariota (born 1993), American football quarterback
Tuiasosopo Mariota, a tribal leader who helped keep American Samoa from being incorporated into the United States
Giuseppe Mariotta, Mayor of Locarno from 1845 to 1848
John Mariotta, founder of the Wedtech Corporation involved in the Wedtech scandal
Mariota Tiumalu Tuiasosopo (1905–1957), author of the American Samoan national anthem
Mariotta Haliburton (c. 1500–c. 1563), Scottish noblewoman

See also
 Marietta (disambiguation)
 Mariot, a surname
 Marriott (disambiguation)
 Mariotto (disambiguation)